Wacław Piotrowski (4 September 1887 – 2 June 1967) was a Polish painter. His work was part of the painting event in the art competition at the 1928 Summer Olympics.

References

1887 births
1967 deaths
20th-century Polish painters
20th-century Polish male artists
Olympic competitors in art competitions
Artists from Warsaw
Polish male painters